Pillur is a village in Tiruvarur district, Tamil Nadu, India. It has a population of about 2,500.  Agriculture is the main business and source of income for the people.  People believe that the village got its name after a visit by Lord Siva and Parvathi. This village has many historical temples, including Jayambal Sametha Jayenkondeshwarar Swamy Temple and Sri Poorna Pushkalambal Sametha Hari Hara Puthra Swami and temple.

It has four main streets: Agraharam, Keelanathem, Nadunathem and Melnathem. All the streets are independent in street related issues (like welfare, committee, etc.)

The people are well educated.  Most of the families are involved in agriculture and cattle also some people are doing IT related business and some are software developers, also cinema industry like directors, producers, actors. More than 10 are in Indian military agribusiness.

Villages in Tiruvarur district